The Ingersoll Clash was an annual bonspiel on the men's and women's Ontario Curling Tour. It was held annually in September at the Ingersoll & District Curling Club in Ingersoll, Ontario. It was discontinued after 2014.

Past Men's Champions

Past Women's Champions

Ontario Curling Tour events
Ingersoll, Ontario